Sermoise is a commune in the Aisne department in Hauts-de-France in northern France.

Population

The inhabitants of the town of Sermoise are called Sermoisiens.

See also
Communes of the Aisne department

References

Communes of Aisne
Aisne communes articles needing translation from French Wikipedia